Cernotina is a genus of tube maker caddisflies in the family Polycentropodidae. There are more than 70 described species in Cernotina.

Species
These 71 species belong to the genus Cernotina:

 Cernotina abbreviata Flint, 1971
 Cernotina acalyptra Flint, 1971
 Cernotina aestheticella Sykora, 1998
 Cernotina anhanguera
 Cernotina artiguensis Angrisano, 1994
 Cernotina aruma
 Cernotina astera Ross, 1941
 Cernotina attenuata Flint, 1971
 Cernotina bibrachiata Flint, 1971
 Cernotina bispicata
 Cernotina cacha Flint, 1971
 Cernotina cadeti Flint, 1968
 Cernotina calcea Ross, 1938
 Cernotina caliginosa Flint, 1968
 Cernotina carbonelli Flint, 1983
 Cernotina chelifera Flint, 1972
 Cernotina cingulata Flint, 1971
 Cernotina compressa Flint, 1971
 Cernotina cygnaea Flint, 1971
 Cernotina cygnea Flint
 Cernotina cystophora Flint, 1971
 Cernotina declinata Flint, 1971
 Cernotina decumbens Flint, 1971
 Cernotina depressa Flint, 1974
 Cernotina ecotura Sykora, 1998
 Cernotina encrypta Flint, 1971
 Cernotina falcata
 Cernotina fallaciosa Flint, 1983
 Cernotina filiformis Flint, 1971
 Cernotina flexuosa
 Cernotina harrisi Sykora, 1998
 Cernotina hastilis Flint, 1996
 Cernotina intersecta Flint, 1974
 Cernotina lanceolata
 Cernotina laticula Ross, 1952
 Cernotina lobisomem
 Cernotina longispina
 Cernotina longissima Flint, 1974
 Cernotina lutea Flint, 1968
 Cernotina mandeba Flint, 1974
 Cernotina mastelleri Flint, 1992
 Cernotina mediolaba Flint, 1972
 Cernotina medioloba Flint
 Cernotina nigridentata Sykora, 1998
 Cernotina obliqua Flint, 1971
 Cernotina odonta
 Cernotina ohio Ross, 1939
 Cernotina oklahoma Ross, 1938
 Cernotina pallida (Banks, 1904)
 Cernotina perpendicularis Flint, 1971
 Cernotina pesae
 Cernotina sexspinosa Flint, 1983
 Cernotina sinosa Ross, 1952
 Cernotina sinuosa
 Cernotina spicata Ross, 1938
 Cernotina spinigera Flint, 1971
 Cernotina spinosior Flint, 1991
 Cernotina stannardi Ross, 1952
 Cernotina subapicalis Flint, 1971
 Cernotina taeniata Ross, 1952
 Cernotina tiputini Camargos, Ríos-Touma & Holzenthal, 2017
 Cernotina trispina Flint, 1971
 Cernotina truncona Ross, 1947
 Cernotina uara Flint, 1971
 Cernotina uncifera Ross, 1952
 Cernotina unguiculata Flint, 1971
 Cernotina verna Flint, 1983
 Cernotina verticalis Flint, 1971
 Cernotina waorani Camargos, Ríos-Touma & Holzenthal, 2017
 Cernotina zanclana Ross, 1952
 † Cernotina pulchra Wichard, 2007

References

Further reading

 
 
 

Trichoptera genera
Articles created by Qbugbot